"Love Me Tonight" is a song performed by Tom Jones.  It reached #2 on the adult contemporary chart, #9 on the UK Singles Chart, and #13 on the U.S. pop chart in 1969.

The song was arranged by Johnnie Spence and produced by Peter Sullivan.

The song ranked #94 on Billboard magazine's Top 100 singles of 1969.

Original song

"Love Me Tonight" is a reworked English-language version of the Italian song "Alla fine della strada" ("To the End of the Road"), which was written by Lorenzo Pilat, with lyrics by Mario Panzeri and Daniele Pace, and performed by Junior Magli and the Casuals at the Sanremo Music Festival 1969. British author and songwriter Barry Mason wrote the English lyrics, which no bear relation to the original Italian.

Other versions
Ronnie Aldrich and His Two Pianos featuring the London Festival Orchestra released a version of the song on their 1969 album Destination Love.
The Casuals released a version of the song on their 1969 album Hour World.
Ray Conniff and The Singers released a version of the song on their 1969 album Jean.
Martin Denny released a version of the song on his 1969 album Exotic Moog.
Ted Heath and His Music released a version of the song on their 1969 album The Big Ones.
James Last released a version of the song on his 1969 album Non Stop Dancing 9.
Johnny Mathis released a version of the song on his 1969 album Love Theme from "Romeo And Juliet" (A Time for Us).
Mantovani released a version of the song on his 1969 album The World of Mantovani.
The Alan Caddy Orchestra & Singers released a version of the song on their 1970 album The Tom Jones Story.
Arthur Fiedler and the Boston Pops Orchestra released a version of the song on their 1971 album Arthur Fiedler Superstar.
Pink Lady released a version of the song on their 1979 album Kiss in the Dark.

References

1969 songs
1969 singles
Songs written by Mario Panzeri
Songs written by Barry Mason
Tom Jones (singer) songs
Johnny Mathis songs
Parrot Records singles
Song recordings produced by Peter Sullivan (record producer)